The Maluti redfin (Pseudobarbus quathlambae) is a ray-finned fish species in the family Cyprinidae. It is colloquially called the Maluti minnow, but it is not a true minnow.

It is Lesotho's only endemic freshwater fish, and threatened by the impact of invasive species, such as Smallmouth yellowfish.

References 

Pseudobarbus
Cyprinid fish of Africa
Endemic fauna of Lesotho
Fish described in 1938
Taxonomy articles created by Polbot